After All may refer to:

Music 
 After All!, a one-act comic opera
 After All (Canadian band), a band later known as Pure

Albums 
 After All (album), an album by Luciano
 After All, an album by Bobby Bland
 After All..., an album by Motoi Sakuraba

Songs 
 "After All" (All Saints song)
 "After All" (Cher and Peter Cetera song)
 "After All" (David Bowie song)
 "After All" (Delerium song)
 "After All" (Ed Bruce song)
 "After All" (The Miracles song), covered by The Supremes
 "After All", by Al Jarreau from High Crime
 "After All", by Brett James
 "After All", by Collective Soul from Blender
 "After All", by Dar Williams from The Green World
 "After All", by Electric Light Orchestra from Secret Messages
 "After All", by The Frank and Walters
 "After All", by Patty Loveless from Patty Loveless
 "After All", by Pet Shop Boys from Concrete
 "After All", by Saving Abel, a non-album B-side from Saving Abel
 "After All", by Whitesnake from Flesh & Blood
 "After All (I Live My Life)", a song by Frankie Miller from Once in a BMoon

Literature 
 After All, an autobiography by actress Mary Tyler Moore
 After All, a novel by Mary Cholmondeley
 After All, a play by John Van Druten
 Afterall, a contemporary art journal